Erateina julia is a species of moth in the family Geometridae first described by Edward Doubleday in 1848. These day-flying moths are typically montane and can be found in Neotropical cloud forests of Bolivia.

References
 Encyclopedia of Life
 GBIF

Moths described in 1848
Larentiinae
Geometridae of South America
Moths of South America